Joe Cloud is an American politician. He serves as a Republican member for the 71st district of the Arkansas House of Representatives.

Cloud attended the University of Arkansas at Little Rock, where he earned his Bachelor of Science degree, then earned a medical degree at the University of Arkansas for Medical Sciences. Cloud practised as a physician. In 2019 he was elected for the 71st district of the Arkansas House of Representatives. He assumed office on January 14, 2019. In August 2021 Cloud announced that he would not seek re-election.

References 

Living people
Place of birth missing (living people)
Year of birth missing (living people)
Republican Party members of the Arkansas House of Representatives
21st-century American politicians
University of Arkansas at Little Rock alumni
University of Arkansas for Medical Sciences alumni
American physicians